The Town of Brome Lake (officially Ville de Lac-Brome) is a town in southern Quebec, Canada. The population as of the Canada 2011 Census was 5,609. Tourism is a major industry in the village of Knowlton because of skiing in the winter, lake activities in summer, and autumn leaf colour.

History

The village was founded in 1802 by United Empire Loyalists from the New England states and New York. Originally known as Coldbrook for the stream that runs through the centre of the village, in 1855 the village had become the county seat of Brome County, Quebec. In 1971, seven villages on Brome Lake (Bondville, East Hill, Foster, Fulford, Knowlton, Iron Hill, and West Brome) were amalgamated to create the current town, which is now in the Brome-Missisquoi Regional County Municipality of the Estrie administrative region.

Geography

Metamorphic rock of Cambrian age—mostly schist and phyllite—underlies the area. Quaternary glaciation left deposits of stony loam till plus outwash sands and gravels. Brown podzolic and podzol soils are most common. Gleysols and peats occur in poorly drained areas.

The area's most significant soil is the Blandford series. This well-drained loam developed under deciduous forest. Settlers exploited this forest for wood, potash, and maple sugar. Cleared areas were found to be productive for crops and pasture. Much former farmland has reverted to forest and today provides a supply of hardwood lumber.

Demographics 

Education 
École Saint-Édouard, (CSVDC)
Knowlton Academy (Eastern Townships School Board)

Media
Brome Lake has one radio station serving its local area, the Knowlton-based CIDI-FM 99.1 MHz.

In film
In 1968, Paramount Studios chose Knowlton as the location to film the children's movie My Side of the Mountain (film), an adaptation of a book by Jean Craighead George. Many scenes from the village were used as well as a man-made pond at the corner of Chemin Paramount and Chemin Paige near Mount Glen.

In 1975, Knowlton was used as one of the sites for filming the Jodie Foster suspense film The Little Girl Who Lives Down the Lane.

Notable people
Paul Holland Knowlton
Paul Martin
Louise Penny

See also
List of cities in Quebec

References

External links

Town of Brome Lake - Ville de Lac-Brome - official municipal website

Cities and towns in Quebec
Incorporated places in Brome-Missisquoi Regional County Municipality